In mathematics, Degen's eight-square identity establishes that the product of two numbers, each of which is a sum of eight squares, is itself the sum of eight squares.
Namely:

First discovered by Carl Ferdinand Degen around 1818, the identity was independently rediscovered by John Thomas Graves (1843) and Arthur Cayley (1845). The latter two derived it while working on an extension of quaternions called octonions. In algebraic terms the identity means that the norm of product of two octonions equals the product of their norms: . Similar statements are true for quaternions (Euler's four-square identity), complex numbers (the Brahmagupta–Fibonacci two-square identity) and real numbers.  In 1898 Adolf Hurwitz proved that there is no similar bilinear identity for 16 squares (sedenions) or any other number of squares except for 1,2,4, and 8.  However, in the 1960s, H. Zassenhaus, W. Eichhorn, and A. Pfister (independently) showed there can be a non-bilinear identity for 16 squares. 

Note that each quadrant reduces to a version of Euler's four-square identity:

and similarly for the other three quadrants. 

Comment: The proof of the eight-square identity is by algebraic evaluation. The eight-square identity can be written in the form of a product of two inner products of 8-dimensional vectors, yielding again an inner product of 8-dimensional vectors: . This defines the octonion multiplication rule , which reflects Degen's 8-square identity and the mathematics of octonions.

Thus,

where,

and,

with,

Incidentally, the  obey the identity,

See also 
Pfister's sixteen-square identity
Cayley–Dickson construction
Hypercomplex number
Latin square

External links
Degen's eight-square identity on MathWorld
The Degen–Graves–Cayley Eight-Square Identity
Pfister's 16-Square Identity

Analytic number theory
Mathematical identities
Squares in number theory